McLaughlin Motor Car Company Limited was a Canadian manufacturer of automobiles headquartered in Oshawa, Ontario. Founded by Robert McLaughlin, it once was the largest carriage manufacturing factory in the British Empire.

Around 1905, Robert's son, Colonel "Sam" McLaughlin starting building automobiles. By 1907 it had grown to include the manufacture of McLaughlin automobiles with Buick engines and in 1915, it manufactured Chevrolet vehicles for the U.S. and Canadian market. The carriage end of the business was then sold to Carriage Factories Limited of Orillia, Ontario. James Brockett Tudhopes Carriage Factories would end carriage production towards manufacturing of truck and car parts. Tudhope firm was sold in 1924 to Cockshutt Plow Company and merged into Cockshutt Plow owned Canada Carriage and Body Limited of Brantford. The Brantford-based firm is now Trailmobile Canada.

McLaughlin was taken over by General Motors in 1918 and merged into General Motors Canada.

History

McLaughlin Carriage Works 

In need of more workers to build his horse-drawn carriages, staunch Presbyterian McLaughlin moved to Oshawa, Ontario in 1876.

McLaughlin developed, and in the early 1880s, patented a fifth-wheel mechanism, which greatly improved comfort and safety. Attracting a great deal of demand, he ignored tempting offers and elected to sell the mechanism to his competitors rather than license other manufacturers. This enthusiasm, now for his complete carriages, spread across Canada. Before the end of the century, there was a McLaughlin sales office in London, England.

On 7 December 1899, the carriage works was destroyed by fire. "We were helpless," R.S. "Sam" McLaughlin later told Maclean's Magazine, "we could only stand and watch our life's work go up in flames.  Not only we McLaughlins, but the six hundred men who depended for a living on the carriage works." The City of Oshawa lent McLaughlin $50,000 to rebuild.

McLaughlin Carriage Company of Canada Limited was incorporated in 1901, and production numbers that year topped 25,000 units and included 140 different models, and sales exceeded one million dollars.

By 1915 McLaughlin was making one carriage every ten minutes. McLaughlin Carriage Company was sold to Carriage Factories Limited of Orillia, Ontario, in 1915. The major carriage manufacturers did not close their doors but switched to automobile bodies.

Automobile Manufacturing

McLaughlin-Buick 

Around 1905, Robert's son, Colonel "Sam" McLaughlin, became interested in manufacturing automobiles and traveled to Jackson, Michigan to purchase a Jackson vehicle.  While in Jackson, Sam bumped into Billy Durant who was manufacturing in that city. Sam and Billy had become acquainted as both been affiliated with the carriage manufacturing business. Durant offered to make a deal. McLaughlin purchased a Buick from a dealer in Toronto to better understand the product. Before he was halfway to Oshawa (approximately a 30-mile drive), McLaughlin knew he preferred the design of the Buick to the Jackson automobile. However, he and Durant were unable to reach a deal to combine manufacturing operations.

Instead, McLaughlin decided to form his enterprise. In 1907 The McLaughlin Motor Car Company Limited was formed. An American engineer by the name of Arthur Milbrath was hired away from A.O. Smith to design the McLaughlin Model A automobile. "We brought him [Milbrath] to Oshawa," Sam later recounted, "and installed him in one of our buildings, on the west side of Mary Street, which had been set aside as the automobile shop.  We equipped it with automatic lathes and other machine tools, planers, and shapers - dozens of machines. From a Cleveland firm, we ordered cylinders, pistons, and crankshafts to our specifications, and engine castings to be worked in our own shop.  The car was to be more powerful than the Buick." Shortly after that, operations came to a stand-still when Milbrath fell ill with pleurisy and the vehicle could not be completed. It has been suggested that Milbraith's ailment was actually a case of "diplomatic flu" which gave the McLaughlins an excuse to partner up with Durant and build Buicks.  Milbrath later founded the Wisconsin Motor Manufacturing Company.

When McLaughlin wired Durant for assistance, in September 1907, the next day, Durant and William H. Little, another Buick executive arrived in Oshawa. The two carriage men, Durant and McLaughlin, hammered out a fifteen-year contract under which McLaughlin would buy drive trains from Buick Motors. These cars were sold with the brand-name McLaughlin though the name McLaughlin-Buick also appeared on some vehicles. This alliance with Buick Motor Company was controlled by an exchange of a large parcel of McLaughlin stock for a corresponding amount of Buick stock. Durant, also a partner in Durant-Dort had a great deal in common with Sam McLaughlin, as both were part of the largest carriage companies in their respective countries.

In 1908, the McLaughlins' manufactured 154 vehicles, the same year that Durant leveraged Buick to form General Motors. Durant borrowed heavily and bought other automotive businesses for his General Motors including Oldsmobile, Cadillac and Oakland (Pontiac) but vehicle sales collapsed, factories were closed for twelve months, and more and in 1910 Durant lost his control of General Motors to bankers that agreed to bail out the company. The McLaughlin shares that Durant held were placed in a trust company in New York, except for one share that Durant sold to Charles Williams Nash and one to Thomas Neal.

With Sam McLaughlin's financial help, Durant started a new business with racing driver Louis Chevrolet. Durant took control of Chevrolet and sold stock in a new business, Chevrolet Canada. In 1916 Durant regained control of General Motors, and in 1916 General Motors Corporation was formed with Sam McLaughlin, director, and vice president. McLaughlin began manufacturing Chevrolet automobiles for Durant and General Motors. By 1914 McLaughlin had built about 1,100 of his cars.

General Motors Canada
General Motors Canada was incorporated in 1918 and bought McLaughlin and Chevrolet Canada and General Motors Corporation spent $10 million building a Walkerville, Ontario plant and establishing Canadian Products. In 1923 the name of the Canadian-bodied model was officially changed to McLaughlin-Buick and cars with this name continued to be produced until 1942. Later production was labelled Buick without the addition of McLaughlin or Canada.

McLaughlin remained chairman of the board of General Motors of Canada and vice-president and executive director of the parent company until his death, aged 100, in 1972.

The automobiles
The first McLaughlin automobile was the 1908 Model F.

Until 1914, the cars were finished with the same paints and varnishes used on carriages. This meant each vehicle required up to fifteen coats of paint.

In 1927 two identical specially designed four-door touring the company built cars for the Royal Tour of Canada, one to be shipped ahead to the next city while the other was in use.

In 1936 a McLaughlin-Buick was purchased by the Prince of Wales.

In 1936 the Dunsmuirs, a coal magnate family in Victoria, British Columbia, ordered three special order 1936 Buick-McLaughlin Phaetons for three of their daughters. In 1937, the Phaeton roadster bought for Elinor Dunsmuir was used to drive U.S. president Franklin Roosevelt around Victoria, BC during his state visit. This is verified by photos appearing in the Times Colonist and the Victoria Times newspapers 1 October 1937 because each of the Dunsmuir phaetons was unique.

Two McLaughlin-Buick Phaetons were built for the 1939 Royal tour. One of these later carried Prince Charles and Diana, Princess of Wales, during their 1986 visit to Canada.

Duties and other import taxes
Residents of other rapidly developing countries living under conditions not unlike the U.S. and Canada had a strong preference for well-engineered and robust American cars. The countries of the British Empire – England, India, South Africa, Australia, and others – gave preference by charging much lower import taxes on goods from another member of the Empire, such as Canada. Taxes were adjusted to the proportion of Canadian content. Canada made and supplied General Motors vehicles to those countries, fitting them with right-hand drive. During World War I, Britain erected high tariff barriers to protect their industry from America's low-priced mass-produced but good-quality cars. By 1923 Canada had the world's second-largest automotive industry. These exports fell to a trickle after World War II because Canada was part of the dollar area and therefore set apart from the British Empire's sterling area. The British were struggling to repay U.S. War Loans and unwilling to allow their businesses unrestricted access to Canada's currency to buy Canadian cars.

See also

 Canadian Automotive Museum
 General Motors Canada
 List of automobile manufacturers
 McLaughlin Motor Car Showroom
 Reynolds-Alberta Museum

Bibliography
 Heather Robertson, Driving Force, The McLaughlin Family and the Age of the Car, McClelland & Stewart, 1995,

Notes

References

External links

 Ingenium Canada's Museum of Science and Technology
 McLaughlin family fonds, Archives of Ontario

1869 establishments in Ontario
Canadian companies established in 1869
Vehicle manufacturing companies established in 1869
1918 disestablishments in Ontario
Vehicle manufacturing companies disestablished in 1918
Companies based in Oshawa
Defunct motor vehicle manufacturers of Canada
History of manufacturing in Ontario
General Motors marques
Buick
Brass Era vehicles
Veteran vehicles
1900s cars
1910s cars